Melon is a South Korean online music store and music streaming service introduced in November 2004, and developed by SK Telecom. LOEN Entertainment (became Kakao M and then Kakao Entertainment) became the company-in-charge of the service in 2009. In 2017, Kakao merged Kakao Music into Melon to have one, unified music streaming service.

Melon is South Korea's largest music subscription service, with over 28 million users. Melon is the most popular music streaming service in South Korea. In fact, a survey of users of smartphones found that they were the most used applications by Koreans. Melon users can stream and download music and music videos and create custom ringtones. Melon is currently available on iOS and Android.

The name Melon is an acronym of the phrase melody on.

History 
Melon was founded in November 16, 2004 in south  Korea by SK Telecom, South Korea's largest wireless carrier. Where it attracted more than 10,000 subscribers per day on average, surpassing 310,000 on its first few months. In October 2008, SK Telecom transferred the majority of Melon's stock to its shareholder Loen Entertainment for approximately 24.3 billion KRW. In July 2013, SK Planet, a subsidiary of SK Telecom, sold 52.56 % of its stake in Loen Entertainment to Star Invest Holdings Limited, a subsidiary of Affinity Equity Partners, a Hong Kong-based private equity firm. Later in January 2016, Kakao acquired a 76.4% stake in the company for 1.87 trillion won (approximately $1.64 billion). In 2018, Kakao M spun-off from Kakao, but Melon stayed.

In 2021, Melon merged with Kakao Entertainment and rebranded itself as "Melon M". This joint venue aimed to secure their leadership in the showbiz industry. Lee Jae-wook will lead the joint. At that time, the streaming platform boasted 33 million users and around 5 million paying users.

International operations 
In 2010, Melon was launched by SK Telecom in Indonesia, in partnership with Telkom Indonesia. In 2016, Telkom Indonesia bought all the stake formerly owned by SK Telecom following the SK Telecom's divestment from all Melon businesses, thus making Melon Indonesia an Indonesian company.

Promotions

Music programs on TV

Melon is the main sponsor of the following music-related shows:
 Inkigayo (SBS, October 2010 – December 2016, re-sponsored since February 2017. Previously known as Popular Song and The Music Trend.)
 Show! Music Core (MBC, August 2014 – March 2018)
 Show Champion (MBC Music, January 2013 – May 2018)
 You Hee-yeol's Sketchbook (KBS 2TV)
 Immortal Songs: Singing the Legend (KBS 2TV)
 K-pop Star  (SBS, all six seasons from 2011 – 2017)
 Tribe of Hip Hop (JTBC)
 King of Mask Singer (MBC, since June 2017)
 MIXNINE (JTBC) (2017 – 2018)
 Music Bank (KBS 2TV, since January 2020)

Melon Music Awards 

In 2009, LOEN Entertainment launched the Melon Music Awards (MMA), an award-giving body dedicated to calculating digital sales and online votes to judge the winners.

Achievements

Songs with the most weeks at number one

12 weeks
 NewJeans – "Ditto" (2023)

11 weeks
 BTS – "Dynamite" (2020)
 
8 weeks
 YB – "It Must Have Been Love" (2005)
 Big Bang – "Last Farewell" (2007)
 Girls' Generation – "Gee" (2009)
 Zico – "Any Song" (2020)
 Mirani, Munchman, Khundi Panda, Mushvenom feat. Justhis – "VVS" (2020)
 Brave Girls – "Rollin'" (2017)

7 weeks
 Wonder Girls – "Tell Me" (2007)
 Big Bang – "Haru Haru" (2008)
 Soyou & Junggigo – "Some" (2014)

6 weeks
 SG Wannabe – "Crime and Punishment" (2005)
 Kim Jong-kook – "Standstill" (2005)
 Buzz – "Love From a Real Heart" (2005)
 Gavy NJ Project Group – "Love All" (2006)
 Yangpa – "Love... What Is It?" (2007)
 F.T. Island – "Love Sick" (2007)
 Big Bang – "Lies" (2007)
 Wonder Girls – "So Hot" (2008)
 Baek Ji-young – "Like Being Hit By a Bullet" (2008)
 IU – "You & I" (2011)
 Psy – "Gangnam Style" (2012)
 Ailee – "I Will Go to You Like the First Snow" (2017)
 iKon – "Love Scenario" (2018)
 IU – "Celebrity" (2021)
 M.O.M – "Foolish Love" (2021)
 The Kid Laroi & Justin Bieber – "Stay" (2021)
 Kim Min-seok – Drunken Confession (2022)
 Younha – "Event Horizon" (2022)

Artists with most number one songs

Artists with most weeks at number one

Artists with most months at number one

Longest charting songs on weekly chart

Most liked songs of all time

Most streamed artists of all time

All-time records

 Most streamed artist: BTS (12.37B streams)
 Most streamed song: BTS ㅡ "Spring Day" (896.1M streams)
 Song with most unique listeners: Busker Busker ㅡ "Cherry Blossom Ending", BTS ㅡ "Spring Day" (8M ULs)
 Longest-running No 1 song on hourly chart: NewJeans – "Ditto" (2013 hours)
 Longest-running No 1 song on daily chart: NewJeans – "Ditto" (84 days)
 Longest-running No 1 song on weekly chart: NewJeans – "Ditto" (12 weeks) 
 Longest-running No 1 song on monthly chart: BTS ㅡ "Dynamite", Brave Girls ㅡ "Rollin'" (3 months)
 Longest-running Top 5 song on weekly chart: BTS ㅡ "Dynamite" (30 weeks)
 Longest-running Top 10 song on weekly chart: BTS ㅡ "Dynamite" (36 weeks)
 Longest-running Top 10 song on yearly chart: Paul Kim ㅡ "Every Day, Every Moment", BTS (feat. Halsey) ㅡ "Boy with Luv" (2 years)
 Longest-running Top 100 song on daily chart: BTS ㅡ "Spring Day" (~2,200 days)
 Longest-running Top 100 song on weekly chart: BTS ㅡ "Spring Day" (316 weeks)
 Longest-running Top 100 song on yearly chart: BTS ㅡ "Spring Day" (6 years)
 Shortest time to reach No 1 for a song on hourly chart (24Hits System): IU ㅡ "Celebrity" (3 hours)
 Most roof-hit song: Zico ㅡ "Any Song" (51 roof-hits)
 Most unique listeners for a song in 1st 24 hours: IU ㅡ "Bbibbi" (1,462,625 ULs)

Accolades 
Melon became one of "Korea's Best 25 Apps" in the 2011 App Awards Korea.

Melon was recognized at the 2012 Trusted Brand Awards.

Melon won the "Grand Prize for Digital Contents" in the 2012 Korean Digital Management Innovation Awards.

Melon was recognized in the 2012 Korea Brand Power Index.

Ilgan Sports ranked Melon as the 3rd most influential entity in the K-pop industry in a November 2013 poll in celebration of its 44th anniversary.

See also 
Naver VIBE
SK Telecom
Kakao M
Apple Music
Tidal
iTunes
Kakao Music
Melon Music Awards

Notes

References

External links 
  

Kakao M
Music streaming services
IOS software
Android (operating system) software
Online music stores of South Korea
Internet properties established in 2004